The Ballpark of the Palm Beaches is a baseball park located in West Palm Beach, Florida. The stadium has a capacity of 6,500 people in fixed seats with room for 1,000 more on the outfield berm. The stadium hosts the Houston Astros and Washington Nationals Major League Baseball teams annually for spring training. It also hosts the Gulf Coast League Astros and the Gulf Coast League Nationals of the Rookie-level Gulf Coast League.

Facilities

In addition to the stadium itself, the complex provides separate spring training facilities for the two teams. Each team has two major-league-size practice fields, four-minor-league-size practice fields, an agility field, a half field, batting cages, and pitching mounds. The Astros' training facilities are on the north and northeast side of the complex and their offices are behind the stadium's left-field corner, while the Nationals' facilities are on the south and southeast side with offices behind home plate.

In March 2020, The Ballpark of the Palm Beaches became a coronavirus testing site for the City of West Palm Beach during the COVID-19 pandemic. It stopped offering testing at the end of May 2021.

Construction
A groundbreaking ceremony took place on November 9, 2015, and construction of the new facility was accelerated so that it could be completed in 16 months. Astros and Nationals pitchers and catchers officially reported for spring training at the new facility on February 14, 2017, followed by the rest of the players for both teams on February 17. Construction was not yet complete, but the teams were able to prioritize the parts of the facilities most important to spring training so that it met their needs by the reporting dates. As construction continued, both the Nationals and the Astros began their 2017 spring training schedules on February 25 with three straight road games before their first game at the new ballpark.

Opening
With construction crews still putting the finishing touches on the stadium during the morning, the Nationals and Astros opened the Ballpark of the Palm Beaches with their first game there on February 28, 2017, with the Nationals playing as the home team. Commissioner of Baseball Rob Manfred cut a ceremonial ribbon, and a helicopter flyover took place during the opening ceremonies.

Before a crowd of 5,897, Nationals non-roster invitee Jeremy Guthrie threw the first pitch at 1:07 p.m. EST, to Astros first baseman Marwin González, who he eventually struck out. In the bottom of the first inning, Nationals second baseman Daniel Murphy doubled for the first hit in the ballpark's history, and a few minutes later scored its first run when Nationals right fielder Bryce Harper doubled to drive him home. In the top of the fourth inning, Astros designated hitter Carlos Beltrán hit the stadium's first home run, and catcher Derek Norris hit the first Nationals home run in the park's history in the bottom of the fourth. With two outs in the bottom of the ninth, outfielder Michael A. Taylor hit a walk-off solo home run to give the Nationals a 4–3 victory.

The first official regular season professional game at the complex was a Gulf Coast League game held on June 27, 2017, as the Gulf Coast League Astros hosted the Gulf Coast League Marlins. The Marlins won by a score of 14–9. The first official regular season professional game played inside the stadium itself was another Gulf Coast League game held on the evening of July 5, 2017, as the host Gulf Coast League Astros defeated their cross-complex rivals, the Gulf Coast League Nationals, by a score of 7–2.

Culture and entertainment

Coincident with their 2017 move to The Ballpark of the Palm Beaches for spring training, the Washington Nationals announced that three former participants in the Presidents Race run during the regular season at Nationals Park in Washington, D.C. – Racing Presidents Calvin Coolidge ("Cal"), Herbert Hoover ("Herbie"), and William Howard Taft ("Bill") – had retired permanently to Florida, where they would compete against one another in races held during Nationals spring training games. The races take place during the fourth inning of Nationals games held at FITTEAM Ballpark of the Palm Beaches.

References

External links

 

Washington Nationals spring training venues
Houston Astros spring training venues
Grapefruit League venues
Baseball venues in Florida
Spring training ballparks
Buildings and structures in West Palm Beach, Florida
Sports venues in Palm Beach County, Florida
2017 establishments in Florida
Sports venues completed in 2017
Florida Complex League ballparks